The Dominican Convent in the city of Zaragoza, Aragon, Spain is a former Dominican priory.

The remains of Eudoxia Laskarina Asanina, also known as Irene Lascaris are said to lie here.

See also
Ventimiglia family

References

Monasteries in Aragon
Buildings and structures in Zaragoza
Convents in Spain
Dominican convents
Burial sites of the Laskarid dynasty
Burial sites of the House of Asen
Baroque architecture in Aragon